Together Again, also known as Country and Western Meets Rhythm and Blues, is a studio album by Ray Charles released in 1965 by ABC-Paramount Records.

Track listing
 "Together Again" (Buck Owens) – 2:41
 "I Like to Hear It Sometime" (Joe Edwards) – 2:55
 "I've Got a Tiger by the Tail" (Buck Owens, Harlan Howard) – 2:12
 "Please Forgive and Forget" (Ray Charles) – 3:48
 "I Don't Care" (Buck Owens) – 2:17
 "Next Door to the Blues" (Leroy Kirkland, Pearl Woods) – 2:56
 "Blue Moon of Kentucky" (Bill Monroe) – 2:10
 "Light out of Darkness" (Ray Charles, Rick Ward) – 3:28
 "Maybe It's Nothing at All" (Joe Edwards) – 3:12
 "All Night Long" (Curtis R. Lewis) – 3:06
 "Don't Let Her Know" (Bonnie Owens, Buck Owens, Don Rich) – 2:54
 "Watch It Baby" (Percy Mayfield) – 2:48

Personnel
Ray Charles – piano, vocals
The Jack Halloran Singers - backing vocals
The Raelettes – backing vocals
Onzy Matthews - arranger

References/External links
[ Album review and track info at Allmusic.com]

1965 albums
Ray Charles albums
ABC Records albums
Albums produced by Sid Feller